In enzymology, a valine-pyruvate transaminase is an enzyme that catalyzes the chemical reaction

L-valine + pyruvate  3-methyl-2-oxobutanoate + L-alanine

Thus, the two substrates of this enzyme are L-valine and pyruvate, whereas its two products are 3-methyl-2-oxobutanoate and L-alanine.

This enzyme belongs to the family of transferases, specifically the transaminases, which transfer nitrogenous groups.  The systematic name of this enzyme class is L-valine:pyruvate aminotransferase. Other names in common use include transaminase C, valine-pyruvate aminotransferase, and alanine-oxoisovalerate aminotransferase.  This enzyme participates in valine, leucine and isoleucine biosynthesis.

References

 
 

EC 2.6.1
Enzymes of unknown structure